Cenogmus is a genus of beetles in the family Carabidae, containing the following species:

 Cenogmus castelnaui Csiki, 1932
 Cenogmus interioris (Castelnau, 1867)
 Cenogmus opacipennis (Chaudoir, 1878)

References

Harpalinae